Cotton is an unincorporated community located in Mitchell County, United States.

History
Cotton was originally called "Mapleton", and under the latter name was founded in 1899. The Georgia General Assembly incorporated the place in 1913 as the "Town of Cotton", with municipal corporate limits extending in a one-half mile radius from the central railroad depot. The present name is after the local cotton growing industry. Cotton's town charter was dissolved in 1995.

Geography
Cotton's latitude is at 31.162 and its longitude is at -84.067. Its elevation rests at 325 feet. Cotton appears on the Cotton South U.S. Geological Survey Map.

See also

External links

Former municipalities in Georgia (U.S. state)
Unincorporated communities in Georgia (U.S. state)
Unincorporated communities in Mitchell County, Georgia
Populated places disestablished in 1995